Reza Ali (10 April 1940 – 13 February 2023) was a Bangladesh Awami League politician and a member of the Jatiya Sangsad, representing the Mymensingh-7 constituency during 2009–2014.

Early life

Ali was born in Sylhet on 10 April 1940. He finished L.L.B. and M.A. degrees.

Career

Ali was elected to parliament from Mymensingh-7 as a Bangladesh Awami League candidate in 2008. In 2017, his bodyguard accidentally shot himself in Ali's residence and killed himself while cleaning his shotgun.

Personal life and death

Ali died on 13 February 2023, at the age of 82.

References

1940 births
2023 deaths
9th Jatiya Sangsad members
Awami League politicians
People from Mymensingh District
People from Sylhet